Elizabeth McCaul is a member of the Supervisory Board of the European Central Bank. McCaul previously served as Superintendent of Banks for the State of New York, the head of the New York State Banking Department and held several senior executive positions at Promontory Financial Group, an IBM company. She founded the New York office of the strategy, risk management, and compliance consulting firm, and most recently served as global head of strategy for Promontory and interim chair of Promontory Financial Group Europe.

Career
McCaul began her career in 1985 as an investment banker at Goldman Sachs, where she specialized in energy and project financing.

New York State Banking Department
In 1995, she joined the New York State Banking Department as chief of staff to Neil D. Levin, a former Goldman Sachs colleague who had been appointed Superintendent of Banks. Ms. McCaul became Acting Superintendent in 1997 upon Levin's departure to head the New York State Department of Insurance, and she continued in that capacity for two years. While serving as Acting Superintendent, McCaul established the Banking Department's Tokyo office, its second permanent office outside the U.S.

New York Governor George Pataki nominated McCaul in December 1999 to become Superintendent.  Her nomination was confirmed by the New York State Senate on June 7, 2000.

As Superintendent of Banks, McCaul regulated and supervised New York State's 3,500 financial institutions, including foreign institutions with offices in New York; New York banks with multinational operations; and state-chartered banks, savings and loan, trust companies, mortgage brokers, credit unions, and finance companies.

During McCaul's tenure as Banking Superintendent, her office established a New York State Holocaust Claims Processing Office to assist and advocate on behalf of Holocaust survivors and their heirs who were trying to recover assets wrongfully held or stolen in World War II.  Her office blocked a proposed merger of the Union Bank of Switzerland and the Swiss Bank Corporation in 1998 until the banks promised to cooperate on the return of victim's assets.

McCaul oversaw initiatives to ensure that the New York banking system functioned well in the aftermath of the September 11, 2001, terrorist attacks.

McCaul also was a key negotiator, along with several state attorneys general, of a $484 million multistate settlement with Household International Inc. regarding Household's residential mortgage lending practices. The settlement, which provided approximately $37 million in restitution to up to 25,000 New York borrowers, was at the time the largest predatory lending settlement ever recorded in the U.S.

In March 2003, McCaul announced that she would step down as Superintendent after a short transition period, citing personal reasons. She had recently given birth to her fifth child. At the end of her tenure as Superintendent, McCaul had served eight years with the Banking Department and six years as its chief.

Promontory Financial Group
In September 2003, McCaul joined Promontory Financial Group, then a new consulting firm established by former U.S. Comptroller of the Currency Eugene Ludwig. She established the Washington, D.C.-based firm's New York office, which serves many of the nation's largest global banks and investment houses, and was its partner-in-charge until 2016. In that year, she became CEO of Promontory Europe, responsible or overseeing and directing the firm's operations in continental Europe. She became global head of strategy and chair of Promontory Financial Group Europe in 2019.

During 2012 and 2013, McCaul headed a federally mandated review of mortgage foreclosure practices at Bank of America.

In 2013, the Vatican selected Promontory Financial Group to conduct a forensic review of the Vatican Bank, which McCaul led. Within 48 hours of being hired, Promontory had a 25-person team in place in the bank president's ceremonial offices, charged with examining thousands of electronic and paper documents, including some that were written in Latin.

In July 2016, McCaul discussed the Vatican's financial reforms at the annual meeting of the Leadership Roundtable, a Catholic 501(c)(3) nonprofit organization that promotes best practices and accountability in church management, finances, and administration. McCaul said that in 2013, the year the Vatican hired Promontory, confidence in the church and its bank had been undermined by a lack of transparency, internal controls and adherence to international regulatory practices. The financial reforms advocated by Pope Francis helped to make the church and its institutions more transparent, better governed, compliant with regulations and sustainable, she said, adding, “the days of ripping off the Vatican are over."

On July 11, 2019, the European Central Bank announced it had named McCaul to a non-renewable five-year term as a member of the Supervisory Board, the single supervisory mechanism for the European Central Bank. The Supervisory Board plans and carries out the European Central Bank's responsibilities in overseeing the Euro zone's 114 largest banks.

Personal
McCaul is a graduate of Boston University. She and her husband, Frank Ingrassia, are the parents of seven children.

Affiliations and honors
McCaul is a trustee of Hofstra University and of Cold Spring Harbor Laboratory and is a member of the board of directors of Accion International, a global nonprofit that supports microfinance initiatives and financial inclusion. As New  York State Banking Superintendent, she served as chairman of the Conference of State Bank Supervisors from 2001 to 2002 and was a member of the Federal Financial Institutions Examination Council from 2002 to 2003.

With her husband, McCaul received the 2012 Humanitarian Award from the Juvenile Diabetes Research Foundation's New York City chapter.

References

Living people
American chief executives of fashion industry companies
Boston University alumni
American women bankers
American bankers
Year of birth missing (living people)
American women chief executives
American investment bankers
21st-century American women